Dar Abzar (also Romanized as Dar Ābzār; also known as Darreh Afrāz) is a village in Gavkan Rural District, in the Central District of Rigan County, Kerman Province, Iran. At the 2006 census, its population was 15, in 5 families.

References 

Populated places in Rigan County